Gopher Ordnance Works was a smokeless powder production plant near Coates and Rosemount, Minnesota, United States. It was first opened in 1943. The plant was closed soon after the end of World War II. There are some remains still at the original site which is visible from U.S. Route 52 and County Road 46.

After the government decided it needed a place to open up another gunpowder factory, they chose Dakota County in East Central Minnesota as their prime spot to put up such a factory, specifically, the city of Rosemount.

General plant information
Gopher Ordnance could hold approximately 3,000 employees, however, most of the employees were not hired off site and had already worked in the defense industry. The plant was operated by DuPont. The production lines at Gopher were completed in 1943 and idled until 1944 when the government requested the plant begin production and create three additional production lines. The plant began production in January 1945, and was closed in October of the same year. The gunpowder being produced at the plant was being used for navy artillery shells. The smokestacks were for boiling water that was used to manufacture the gunpowder. The large T-Walls were part of solvent recovery houses. The process involved much volatile material.

Environmental impact
The Minnesota Pollution Control Agency inspected the property in 1981 concluding that based on the limited investigation there was no contamination of concern. The U.S. Army Corps of Engineers began inspections in 1985. In 1999 the U.S. Army Corps of Engineers concluded that the property was eligible for restoration funds. In 2005 the Corps revised its position and stated that only the land transferred to the state in 1947 was eligible, and a detailed investigation was completed in March 2009.

In 2010, the University of Minnesota launched a Remedial Investigation to collect information on the environmental condition of the property.

Advertising
The plant was unable to get employees easily, so it ran ads in local newspapers. One such ad pictured a woman saying, "If you can run a vacuum cleaner, you can do my war job at Gopher".

References

External links

 A Flickr photoset of the GOW ruins, taken in 2006
 Repository of Documents

Companies based in Minnesota
Buildings and structures in Dakota County, Minnesota
United States Army arsenals
United States Army arsenals during World War II
1943 establishments in Minnesota